Angelo Loukas (born February 25, 1947) is a former American football guard and tackle. He played for the Buffalo Bills in 1969 and for the Boston Patriots in 1970. Loukas played in the NFL from 1960 to 1968, winning the NFL Comeback Player of the Year Award in 1962. He was also selected to the NFL's first All-Rookie Team in 1958.

Loukas made his first Pro Bowl in 1970 for the Patriots. He was drafted by the Bills in the 6th round, and played one year in the league, catching 15 passes for 208 yards in 1961. He then played one year of college football with the Buffalo Bulls. In 1965, Loukas joined the Buffalo Bandits, and they played in the legendary AFL Arena Football League until 1967.

References

1947 births
Living people
American football guards
American football tackles
Northwestern Wildcats football players
Buffalo Bills players
Boston Patriots players
Greek emigrants to the United States
Sportspeople from Corinth